Ian Shields is an American college football coach and former player. He is currently an offensive analyst at the University of Nevada, Las Vegas (UNLV), a position he had held since 2020. Shields served as the head football coach at Eastern Oregon University in La Grande, Oregon from 2006 to 2007, Lenoir–Rhyne University in Hickory, North Carolina from 2014 to 2015, and at Jacksonville University in Jacksonville, Florida from 2016 to 2019. He played college football as a quarterback at Oregon State University.

Head coaching record

References

External links
 UNLV profile
 Jacksonville profile

Year of birth missing (living people)
Living people
American football quarterbacks
Army Black Knights football coaches
Bucknell Bison football coaches
Cal Poly Mustangs football coaches
Eastern Oregon Mountaineers football coaches
Minot State Beavers football coaches
Jacksonville Dolphins football coaches
Lenoir–Rhyne Bears football coaches
Oregon State Beavers football coaches
Oregon State Beavers football players
Saint Mary's Gaels football coaches
UNLV Rebels football coaches